Cahuapanas District is one of six districts of the province Datem del Marañón in Peru.

The Cahuapana language is spoken in the district.

References

Districts of the Datem del Marañón Province
Districts of the Loreto Region
1866 establishments in Peru